Sandom Branch is a  long tributary to Blackbird Creek in New Castle County, Delaware.  Sandom Branch is one of the major tributaries to Blackbird Creek above tidal influence.

Course
Sandom Branch rises on the Duck Creek divide about 2 miles south of Blackbird, Delaware.

Watershed
Sandom Branch drains  of area, receives about 43.8 in/year of precipitation, has a topographic wetness index of 556.57 and is about 22.6% forested.

See also
List of Delaware rivers

Maps

References

Rivers of Delaware
Rivers of New Castle County, Delaware
Tributaries of Delaware Bay